The Kollam–Sengottai railway line (formerly known as Quilon–Shencottah or Quilon–Chenkotta line) is a railway line in South India which connects  in Kerala state and  (also spelled Shencottah, Shenkottai, Chengottai, Chenkottai, Senkottai) in Tamil Nadu. The Quilon–Shencottah railway line was the first railway line in the erstwhile Travancore state and is more than a century old. The Kollam–Sengottai section is part of the Kollam–Chennai metre-gauge rail route commissioned by the British in 1904.

History

The Kollam–Sengottai metre-gauge line was conceived and implemented by Maharajah Uthram Thirunal of Travancore. It was built jointly by South Indian Railway Company, Travancore State and the Madras Presidency. After a survey in 1888, work started in 1900 and was completed by 1902. The first goods train travelled on this route in 1902 while the first passenger train began its run in 1904. Metre-gauge services were inaugurated on 1July 1904 with the first passenger train flagged off from Kollam by Maharajah Moolam Thirunal of Travancore with a 21-gun salute. The railway line was constructed by the British in the foothills of the Western Ghats to transport forest products, spices and cashews from Kollam to Chennai, their southern headquarters.

Timeline 
1888 Survey for Quilone-Madras rail started.
 1899 - Survey for Quilon–Madras rail link completed
 1900 - Works for Kollam–Sengottai metre-gauge railway line started to connect the city of Quilon with Madras
 1902 - Kollam–Sengottai Railway line works completed
 1904 - On 1 June, His Highness Moolam Thirunal Rama Varma of Travancore flagged off the first passenger train service on the Kollam–Sengottai railway line at Kollam railway station
 1998 - Gauge conversion of Kollam–Sengottai Railway line officially started
 2007 - On 1 May, rail services on Kollam–Punalur section withdrawn
 2010 - On 10 May, Kollam–Punalur broad-gauge section thrown open for services
 2018 - On 31 March, the entire Kollam–Sengottai line thrown open for passenger train services. The first passenger train on the stretch was Tambaram–Kollam–Tambaram special train service (06027/28) which completed the service by earning Rs 3.15 lakh as passenger ticket collection from its 879 passengers against a capacity of 712.

About the route
The route was once a lifeline for the people of the southern districts of Kerala state and the Sengottai–Virudhunagar belt of Tamil Nadu. It served to create a strong link especially among the trading community of these areas in the two States. British tea estates and coffee plantations thrived on the labour of tribesman living in the Thenmala forests and workers from Tamil Nadu. The railway line contributed much to the development of a plantation economy in this area. The farmers of the Shencottah-Virudhunagar belt depended on the trains to market their produce in south Travancore. Huge quantities of vegetables, groceries and dairy products such as curd were brought into Kollam district from Tamil Nadu by trains that plied the route. The Palaruvi and Kazhuthurutti waterfalls and the Thenmala eco-tourism centre are on the fringes of this line, and the Courtallam waterfalls at the destination make this route popular with nature lovers.

Notable landmarks on the route

 13 Kannara Bridge
The Pathimoonnu Kannara Bridge or 13 Arch Bridge (Pathimoonu kannara palam)  is a 108–year–old bridge at Kazhathuruthi. The bridge consists of 13 arches and is a  major landmark on the Kollam–Sengottai railway line as well as a testimony to the architectural abilities of the British. The bridge connects two hillocks and stands on thirteen granite pillars each almost a hundred feet tall.
 Aryankavu–Puliyara (Kottavasal) tunnel
The Aryankavu tunnel links Aryankavu  in Kerala with Bhagavathipuram in Tamil Nadu. On both sides of the tunnel, the conch shell symbol of the Travancore rulers has been imprinted.

Popular metre-gauge trains on the route

 Train No:6105/6106 (earlier 105/106) Kollam– Mail

This train was introduced in 1904 after the completion of the Quilon–Sengottai–Virudhunagar metre-gauge line and was flagged off by the then Maharaja of Travancore, Moolam Thirunal. The train was later renamed the Quilon–Madras Mail. The train was extended to Trivandrum in 1918 after completion of the Quilon–Trivandrum metre-gauge line. This train was one of the early metre gauge trains to have a First Class. The train was truncated at Quilon after the Kollam–Trivandrum Central metre-gauge track was converted to broad gauge in 1979. The train went through to Madurai Junction railway station via Manamadurai Junction from 1996 when the Virudhunagar–Madurai line was converted to broad gauge. The train was discontinued in June 2000.
 Train No:6383/6384 Tirunelveli–Kollam Express
 Sengottai–Kollam passenger
This passenger train was the main means of transport among office workers and students along this route.

Broad gauge conversion
The Punalur–Sengottai section is part of the 325-km Kollam–Sengottai–Tenkasi–Tirunelveli–Tiruchendur gauge conversion project and part of the Tenkasi–Virudhunagar trunk route to Chennai. The gauge conversion of the Sengottai–Tiruchendur section has been completed and is open to traffic.

Kollam–Punalur section
The Kollam Junction–Punalur metre-gauge railway line to broad-gauge conversion works foundation stone was laid in 1998 at Punalur. Services on the Punalur–Kollam metre-gauge section were withdrawn on 1 May 2007, to facilitate the gauge conversion work. The gauge conversion took almost 11 years to complete after the foundation stone was laid. The 44 km line was converted to broad gauge and inaugurated on 10 May 2010. Passenger train services connecting Punalur to Kollam, Madurai, Guruvayur, Kanyakumari and Palakkad Junction are currently operational in this route.

Punalur–Sengottai section
To facilitate the gauge conversion work on the Punalur–Sengottai section, train services on the section were withdrawn in September 2010. The 49.2-km Punalur–Sengottai section gauge conversion works were completed in December 2017 and the line was commissioned in March 2018. The inaugural Tambaram–Kollam special train (06027) ran through the section on 31 March 2018. The inaugural TBM–QLN special train was later extended to Chennai Egmore (MS) and then regularised w.e.f. 04.03.2019 where the inaugural run of the regular daily express train was flagged off. The regular train is 115 years old and re-started after 19 years. The train MS<>QLN EXP has train numbers 16101 (MS–QLN)/16102 (QLN–MS). The inaugural special run of the regular train had 06101 as the number and had a total of 14 coaches with 8 SL coaches & 2 3A coaches.

Stations
The railway stations in Kollam Junction–Sengottai railway line are

 
 
 
 
 
 
 
 
 
 
 Edaman
 Ottakkal
 
 Kazhuthurutti Halt
 Edapalayam
 
 
 Bhagavathipuram

See also
 Tenkasi Junction

References

Rail transport in Kollam

Economy of Kollam
Rail transport in Kerala
5 ft 6 in gauge railways in India
Railway lines opened in 1904
Transport in Kollam district
Tirunelveli district